Ali Khamis Abbas Ali Khamis (born 30 June 1995) is a Bahraini track and field athlete who competes mainly in the 400 metres sprint and 400 metres hurdles. His personal best for the flat event is 44.36 seconds, set in 2013, while his hurdles best is 49.55 seconds, set in 2014. He was the 2014 Asian Games champion in the hurdles and the runner-up in the sprint at the 2013 Asian Athletics Championships

Career
Khamis made his international debut at the 2011 World Youth Championships in Athletics. There he ran in the heats of the 400 m hurdles and set a personal best of 54.27 seconds over the youth height barriers. He also was part of Bahrain's Swedish medley relay team. At the 2012 Asian Junior Athletics Championships – despite winning his heat in a best of 52.67 seconds – he faltered in the 400 m hurdles final and finished last. He also competed at the 2012 World Junior Championships in Athletics, running in the heats only.

Two national junior records in the 400 metres sprint came for Khamis at the 2013 Arab Athletics Championships: he ran 46.90 seconds in the qualifiers then 46.25 seconds in the final to take the bronze medal (his first senior podium finish) behind Saudi athletes Yousef Masrahi and Ismail Al-Sabiani. He reached the podium for a second time that year at the 2013 Asian Athletics Championships. wtsh
 repeated as champion, Khamis took the silver medal with a significant new best time of 45.65 seconds.

Khamis began his 2014 season with a 400 m sprint/hurdles double at the Arab Junior Athletics Championships in Cairo. He made his debut on the IAAF Diamond League circuit in May, running in the 400 m at the Doha Diamond League and placing runner-up. The hurdles remained his focus that year, as he returned in the event at the 2014 World Junior Championships in Athletics. He set a string of bests at the competition, improving from 51.10 in the heats to 49.55 seconds in the final – a time which brought him second place to Jamaica's Jaheel Hyde. He maintained this form at the 2014 Asian Games held two months later and a run of 49.71 seconds was enough for the Bahraini teenager to win the 400 m hurdles gold medal. He ranked in the top fifty worldwide and second in Asia on time that season, behind only Kazakhstan's Dmitriy Koblov.

Achievements 
 Ranked in top 8 in Olympic Games
 One time Asian Games winner
 Asian Championships Silver Medalist 
 World Junior Championships Silver medalist
 World Rank 23 in Men's 400 metres scoring 1220
 Ranks 319 Globally in Men's Overall Rank with the Score 1220

Personal bests
100 metres - 10.69 seconds (28.06.2015) 
200 metres – 20.81 seconds (11.07.2015)
400 metres – 44.36 seconds (14.08.2016)
400 metres hurdles – 49.55 seconds (25.07.2014)
Sprint Medley 1000 metres - 1:59.16 (09.07.2011)
4 x 400 metres - 3:11.11 (20.05.2017)

International competitions

References

External links
 
 

Living people
1995 births
Bahraini male hurdlers
Bahraini male sprinters
Asian Games medalists in athletics (track and field)
Athletes (track and field) at the 2014 Asian Games
Athletes (track and field) at the 2018 Asian Games
Asian Games gold medalists for Bahrain
Asian Games bronze medalists for Bahrain
Athletes (track and field) at the 2016 Summer Olympics
Olympic athletes of Bahrain
Medalists at the 2014 Asian Games
Medalists at the 2018 Asian Games
Islamic Solidarity Games medalists in athletics